George Matthew Dutcher (1874 - 1959) was an American historian and professor at Wesleyan University.

He was born on 16 September 1874, in Pleasant Valley, New York.

He received a B.A. and a Ph.D. from Cornell University, where he studied under historian George Lincoln Burr, as well as an LL.D. (honorary degree) from Allegheny College in 1939.

He was a member of the Acorn Club, the Phi Beta Kappa, and was vice-president of the Connecticut Historical Society from 1945 to 1954.

He was married to Andrienne Van Winkle. He died on February 22, 1959, at Resthaven Hospital in East Hampton, New York.

Works 
The Political Awakening of the East: Studies of Political Progress in Egypt, India, China, Japan, and the Philippines (The Abingdon Press, 1925)
A Guide to Historical Literature (1937), editor

References 

1874 births
1959 deaths
People from Pleasant Valley, New York
Wesleyan University faculty
Historians from New York (state)